Soldado is a surname associated with the occupation of a soldier. Notable people with the surname include:

Juan Soldado (executed 1938), "Soldier John" a Mexican criminal and folk saint
Roberto Soldado (born 1985), a Spanish football player.

See also

Spanish-language surnames
Occupational surnames